Siren City is a game for the Commodore 64 which involves the player taking the role of an American "cop car" patrolling the streets of dangerous Siren City. Grand Theft Auto developer Steve Hammond discusses Siren City as inspiration for Grand Theft Auto as a "top-down car game with cops".

In the game, Siren City is one of the roughest towns in the whole of the U.S.A.  Starting as a rookie driving through a maze of Skyscrapers and seemingly peaceful streets your job is to keep law & order but you are dealing with some of the toughest criminals not behind bars.  These include Public Enemy No1 : Slit-Throat Steve, Public Enemy No 7 : Dune Buggy Jon and Dr J. Davies Ph.D, V.E.A.S.

Gameplay
The game action is displayed via an aerial view of the city centered on the player's "Cop Car". The player undertakes a number of missions, ending after either a set objective achieved or a fixed time duration. These missions include:
 patrolling the city (very easy)
 chasing down criminals in dragsters
 neutralising a cloud of chemical smog
 evading aggressive pursuit by a rogue armed helicopter (very difficult)

The game is distinguished by a large and detailed city map, including high-rise, difficult-to-navigate suburbs and a working railway line.

References

1983 video games
Action video games
Commodore 64 games
Commodore 64-only games
Video games about police officers
Video games developed in the United Kingdom